Reed–Muller codes are error-correcting codes that are used in wireless communications applications, particularly in deep-space communication. Moreover, the proposed 5G standard relies on the closely related polar codes for error correction in the control channel. Due to their favorable theoretical and mathematical properties, Reed–Muller codes have also been extensively studied in theoretical computer science.

Reed–Muller codes generalize the Reed–Solomon codes and the Walsh–Hadamard code. Reed–Muller codes are linear block codes that are locally testable, locally decodable, and list decodable. These properties make them particularly useful in the design of probabilistically checkable proofs.

Traditional Reed–Muller codes are binary codes, which means that messages and codewords are binary strings. When r and m are integers with 0 ≤ r ≤ m, the Reed–Muller code with parameters  r and m is denoted as RM(r, m). When asked to encode a message consisting of k bits, where   holds, the RM(r, m) code produces a codeword consisting of 2m bits.

Reed–Muller codes are named after David E. Muller, who discovered the codes in 1954, and Irving S. Reed, who proposed the first efficient decoding algorithm.

Description using low-degree polynomials
Reed–Muller codes can be described in several different (but ultimately equivalent) ways. The description that is based on low-degree polynomials is quite elegant and particularly suited for their application as locally testable codes and locally decodable codes.

Encoder 
A block code can have one or more encoding functions  that map messages  to codewords . The Reed–Muller code  has message length  and block length  . One way to define an encoding for this code is based on the evaluation of multilinear polynomials with m variables and total degree r. Every multilinear polynomial over the finite field with two elements can be written as follows:

The  are the variables of the polynomial, and the values  are the coefficients of the polynomial. Since there are exactly  coefficients, the message  consists of  values that can be used as these coefficients. In this way, each message  gives rise to a unique polynomial  in m variables. To construct the codeword , the encoder evaluates  at all evaluation points , where it interprets the sum as addition modulo two in order to obtain a bit . That is, the encoding function is defined via

The fact that the codeword  suffices to uniquely reconstruct  follows from Lagrange interpolation, which states that the coefficients of a polynomial are uniquely determined when sufficiently many evaluation points are given. Since  and  holds for all messages , the function  is a linear map. Thus the Reed–Muller code is a linear code.

Example 
For the code , the parameters are as follows:

Let  be the encoding function just defined. To encode the string x = 1 1010 010101 of length 11, the encoder first constructs the polynomial  in 4 variables:Then it evaluates this polynomial at all 16 evaluation points (0101 means :

As a result, C(1 1010 010101) = 1101 1110 0001 0010 holds.

Decoder 
As was already mentioned, Lagrange interpolation can be used to efficiently retrieve the message from a codeword. However, a decoder needs to work even if the codeword has been corrupted in a few positions, that is, when the received word is different from any codeword. In this case, a local decoding procedure can help.

The algorithm from Reed is based on the following property:
The sequence may contains any number of errors up to  included.

This is due to the fact that all lower monomial divisors of  appears an even number of time in the sum, and only  appears once.

To take into account the possibility of errors, you can also remark that you can fix the value of other variables to any value. If there is no error, all those sums should be equals to the value of the coefficient searched. 
The algorithm consists here to take the majority of the answers as the value searched. If the minority is larger than the maximum number of errors possible, the decoding step fails knowing there are too much errors in the input code.

Once a coefficient is computed, if it's 1, update the code to remove the monomial  from the input code and continue to next monomial, in reverse order of their degree.

Example 

Let's consider the previous example and start from the code. With  we can fix at most 1 error in the code.
Consider the input code as 1101 1110 0001 0110 (this is the previous code with one error).

We know the degree of the polynomial  is at most , we start by searching for monomial of degree 2.

 
In the code this is: 1101 1110 0001 0110. The first sum is 1 (odd number of 1).
In the code this is: 1101 1110 0001 0110. The second sum is 1.
In the code this is: 1101 1110 0001 0110. The third sum is 1.
In the code this is: 1101 1110 0001 0110. The third sum is 0 (even number of 1).

 
 1100 1111 0000 0111. Sum is 0
 1100 1111 0000 0111. Sum is 0
 1100 1111 0000 0111. Sum is 1
 1100 1111 0000 0111. Sum is 0
One error detected, coefficient is 0, no change to current code.
 
 1100 1111 0000 0111. Sum is 0
 1100 1111 0000 0111. Sum is 0
 1100 1111 0000 0111. Sum is 1
 1100 1111 0000 0111. Sum is 0
One error detected, coefficient is 0, no change to current code.
 
 1100 1111 0000 0111. Sum is 1
 100 1111 0000 0111. Sum is 1
 1100 1111 0000 0111. Sum is 1
 1100 1111 0000 0111. Sum is 0

 
 1100 1100 0000 0100. Sum is 1
 1100 1100 0000 0100. Sum is 1
 1100 1100 0000 0100. Sum is 1
 1100 1100 0000 0100. Sum is 0
 
 1100 1100 0011 0111. Sum is 0
 1100 1100 0011 0111. Sum is 1
 1100 1100 0011 0111. Sum is 0
 1100 1100 0011 0111. Sum is 0
One error detected, coefficient is 0, no change to current code.
We know now all coefficient of degree 2 for the polynomial, we can start mononials of degree 1. Notice that for each next degree, there are twice as much sums, and each sums is half smaller.
 
 1100 1100 0011 0111. Sum is 0
 1100 1100 0011 0111. Sum is 0
 1100 1100 0011 0111. Sum is 0
 1100  1100 0011 0111. Sum is 0
 1100  1100 0011 0111. Sum is 0
 1100  1100 0011 0111. Sum is 0
 1100  1100 0011 0111. Sum is 0
 1100  1100 0011 0111. Sum is 1
One error detected, coefficient is 0, no change to current code.
 
 1100 1100 0011 0111. Sum is 1
 1100 1100 0011 0111. Sum is 1
 1100 1100 0011 0111. Sum is 1
 1100 1100 0011 0111. Sum is 1
 1100  1100 0011 0111. Sum is 1
 1100  1100 0011 0111. Sum is 1
 1100  1100 0011 0111. Sum is 1
 1100  1100 0011 0111. Sum is 0

For the degree 0, we have 16 sums of only 1 bit. The minority is still of size 1, and we found  and the corresponding initial word 1 1010 010101

Generalization to larger alphabets via low-degree polynomials 
Using low-degree polynomials over a finite field  of size , it is possible to extend the definition of Reed–Muller codes to alphabets of size . Such a polynomial indeed has  coefficients.

Description using a generator matrix 

A generator matrix for a Reed–Muller code  of length  can be constructed as follows. Let us write the set of all m-dimensional binary vectors as:

We define in N-dimensional space  the indicator vectors

on subsets  by:

referred to as the wedge product (not to be confused with the wedge product defined in exterior algebra).

 is an m-dimensional vector space over the field , so it is possible to write

We define in N-dimensional space  the following vectors with length  and

The generator matrix 
The Reed–Muller  code of order r and length N = 2m is the code generated by v0 and the wedge products of up to r of the vi,   (where by convention a wedge product of fewer than one vector is the identity for the operation). In other words, we can build a generator matrix for the  code, using vectors and their wedge product permutations up to r at a time , as the rows of the generator matrix, where .

Example 1 

Let m = 3. Then N = 8, and

and

The RM(1,3) code is generated by the set

or more explicitly by the rows of the matrix:

Example 2 

The RM(2,3) code is generated by the set:

or more explicitly by the rows of the matrix:

Properties
The following properties hold:

 The RM (r, m) code has rank

  where '|' denotes the bar product of two codes.
  has minimum Hamming weight 2m − r.

Proof

Decoding RM codes 
RM(r, m) codes can be decoded using majority logic decoding. The basic idea of majority logic decoding is
to build several checksums for each received code word element. Since each of the different checksums must all
have the same value (i.e. the value of the message word element weight), we can use a majority logic decoding to decipher
the value of the message word element. Once each order of the polynomial is decoded, the received word is modified
accordingly by removing the corresponding codewords weighted by the decoded message contributions, up to the present stage.
So for a rth order RM code, we have to decode iteratively r+1, times before we arrive at the final
received code-word. Also, the values of the message bits are calculated through this scheme; finally we can calculate
the codeword by multiplying the message word (just decoded) with the generator matrix.

One clue if the decoding succeeded, is to have an all-zero modified received word, at the end of (r + 1)-stage decoding
through the majority logic decoding. This technique was proposed by Irving S. Reed, and is more general when applied
to other finite geometry codes.

Description using a recursive construction

RM(m, m) is defined as the universe code. RM(−1,m) is defined as the trivial code. The remaining RM codes may be constructed from these elementary codes using the length-doubling construction

The dual code to RM(r,m) is RM(m-r-1,m).

Special cases of Reed–Muller codes

Table of all RM(r,m) codes for m≤5 
The code  is a -code, that is, it is a linear code over a binary alphabet, has block length , message length (or dimension) , and minimum distance .

Properties of RM(r,m) codes for r≤1 or r≥m-1 

 codes are repetition codes of length , rate  and minimum distance .
 codes are parity check codes of length , rate  and minimum distance .
 codes are single parity check codes of length , rate  and minimum distance .
 codes are the family of extended Hamming codes of length  with minimum distance .

References

Further reading 

  Chapter 4.
  Chapter 4.5.

External links
 MIT OpenCourseWare, 6.451 Principles of Digital Communication II, Lecture Notes section 6.4
 GPL Matlab-implementation of RM-codes 
 Source GPL Matlab-implementation of RM-codes

Error detection and correction
Coding theory
Theoretical computer science